Karanja Mack (born 24 August 1987) is an Antiguan footballer currently playing for Antigua Barracuda FC in the USL Professional Division.

Club career
Mack played with SAP FC in the Antigua and Barbuda Premier Division from 2006 to 2010, winning the league championship in 2005-06 and 2008–09, and the Antigua and Barbuda FA Cup in 2009, and played for SAP in the group stages of the CFU Club Championship in 2006-07. Mack also had a trial with Trinidadian professional outfit Tobago United in 2008, but did not sign with the team.

In 2011 Mack transferred to the new Antigua Barracuda FC team prior to its first season in the USL Professional Division. He made his debut for the Barracudas in their first competitive game on April 17, 2011, a 2-1 loss to the Los Angeles Blues.

International career
Mack made his debut for Antigua and Barbuda in a November 2006 CONCACAF Gold Cup qualification match against the Dominican Republic and has earned nearly 10 caps since. He played in 2 World Cup qualification games, and was part of the Antigua squad which took part in the final stages of the 2010 Caribbean Championship.

References

External links
 

1987 births
Living people
Antigua and Barbuda footballers
Antigua and Barbuda international footballers
Association football midfielders
SAP F.C. players
Antigua Barracuda F.C. players
USL Championship players
2014 Caribbean Cup players
Antigua and Barbuda under-20 international footballers